Phillip Rista Nimmons,  (born June 3, 1923) is a Canadian jazz clarinetist, composer, bandleader, and educator. Nimmons is known for playing in a "Free Jazz" and mainstream styles.  As well as playing jazz, Nimmons also played other genres, notably classical music.  Nimmons has composed over 400 pieces of music in various genres, and for various instrumentations including film scores, music for radio and television, chamber music, music for large ensembles, concert band and symphony orchestras. Nimmons studied clarinet at the Juilliard School and composition at the Royal Conservatory of Music in Toronto.

Career
Nimmons was born in Kamloops, British Columbia. He joined the University of Toronto in 1973. In 1953 Nimmons formed the ensemble "Nimmons 'N' Nine"  which, later, he led during his weekly radio show on CBC radio. this ensemble grew to 16 musicians in 1965 and was active intil 1980.

As an educator, Nimmons has made substantial contributions to the study of Jazz music. In 1960, Along with Oscar Peterson  Nimmons founded the Advanced School of Contemporary Music in Toronto. Nimmons was involved in the development of the jazz performance program at the University of Toronto.

Awards and honors 
Nimmons received the first Juno Award given in the Juno Awards jazz category, for his album Atlantic Suite. His composition "The Torch" was commissioned for the 1988 Winter Olympics in Calgary. It was performed at the Olympics by a big band led by Rob McConnell.

In 1993, he was made an Officer of the Order of Canada. He is also a recipient of the Order of Ontario. In 2001 Nimmons was a recipient of the Jazz Education Hall of Fame which honors "individuals whose musical contributions and dedication to jazz education over the past 25 years have created new directions and curricular innovations for jazz education worldwide". In 2002, Nimmons received the Governor General's Performing Arts Award, Canada's highest honour in the performing arts, for his lifetime contribution to popular music.

On November 21, 2005, Nimmons was awarded the Lifetime Achievement Award by SOCAN at the SOCAN Awards in Toronto.

Discography
 The Canadian Scene Via the Phil Nimmons Group (Verve, 1956)
 Nimmons 'n' Nine (Verve, 1963)
 Take Ten (RCA, 1963)
 Mary Poppins Swings (RCA, 1964)
 Strictly Nimmons (RCA, 1965)
 Nimmons Now (RCA, 1970)
Jazz Canadiana: all star jazz in concert (CBC, 1973)
 The Atlantic Suite (Sackville, 1975)
The dance never ends (REACO, 1997)
The Canadian scene via Phil Nimmons Group (New York, Verve, 1999)
 Sands of Time (Sackville, 2000)
Vintage Nimmons 'n' Nine CBC Air Checks '59-'64' (Sackville, 2003)
Nimmons 'n nitecap (Vancouver, Capilano College, 2005)
Nimmons 'n' Nine—now (MCCO records, 2008)
 Beginnings (Nimmons 'n' Music, 2009)
Friendly encounter (Marquis, 2009)
 Canadian Composer Portrait: Phil Nimmons (CMC, 2009)

References

External links

 Phil Nimmons at The Canadian Encyclopedia
 Archival manuscripts at University of Toronto Music Library

1923 births
Bebop clarinetists
Canadian composers
Canadian male composers
Canadian jazz composers
Male jazz composers
Canadian jazz clarinetists
Living people
Members of the Order of Ontario
Officers of the Order of Canada
People from Kamloops
Progressive big band bandleaders
Swing clarinetists
The Royal Conservatory of Music alumni
Verve Records artists
Governor General's Performing Arts Award winners
Juno Award for Best Jazz Album winners
21st-century clarinetists
21st-century Canadian male musicians